Regnaud de La Porte (Raynaud) (died 1325) was a French bishop and Cardinal. He was born in Allassac.

He became bishop of Limoges in 1294, and archbishop of Bourges in 1316. He was a papal commissioner enquiring into the Knights Templar, 1309 to 1311.

He was created cardinal in 1320, as cardinal-priest of Ss. Nereo e Achilleo, In 1321 he became bishop of Ostia e Velletri.

Notes

External links
 Salvador Miranda,  The Cardinals of the Holy Roman Church, La Porte, Regnaud de.  Retrieved: 2016-10-22.

 
 

 
 

 
 

1325 deaths
14th-century French cardinals
Cardinal-bishops of Ostia
Archbishops of Bourges
Bishops of Limoges
Year of birth unknown